Cross Island may refer to:

Geography
Cross Island, Alaska, an island in the Beaufort Sea
Cross Island, Bermuda
Cross Island, County Down, a townland in Northern Ireland
Cross Island (Maine), an island in the U.S. state of Maine
Cross Island National Wildlife Refuge, a National Wildlife Refuge in the state of Maine, U.S.
Cross Island (Massachusetts), an island in the U.S. state of Massachusetts
Cross Island (Nova Scotia), an island offshore from Lunenburg, Nova Scotia
Cross Island, Mumbai, an uninhabited islet off the southeast coast of Mumbai
Cross Island Trail, a rail trail in Queen Anne's County, Maryland and part of the American Discovery Trail and the East Coast Greenway

Transportation
Cross Island MRT line, a subway line in Singapore
Cross Island Parkway (Hilton Head Island), in South Carolina, U.S.
Cross Island Parkway, a highway in Long Island, New York, U.S.

Other uses
Cross Island Chapel, a non-denominational church located in Oneida, New York

See also
Cross Bronx Expressway
Cross country (disambiguation)
Cross County